Virgin and Child with an Angel can refer to:

Virgin and Child with an Angel (Botticelli, Florence)
Virgin and Child with an Angel (Botticelli, Boston)
Madonna and Child with an Angel (Moretto)
Nursing Madonna with an Angel by Correggio